The 1947 Lehigh Engineers football team was an American football team that represented Lehigh University during the 1947 college football season.  In its second season under head coach William Leckonby, the team compiled a 5–4 record and was outscored by a total of 122 to 111. The team played its home games at Taylor Stadium in Bethlehem, Pennsylvania.

On October 4, 1947, the team achieved the 250th victory in the 63-year history of Lehigh football dating back to 1884.

Schedule

References

Lehigh
Lehigh Mountain Hawks football seasons
Lehigh Engineers football